Ulrich Taffertshofer (born 14 February 1992) is a German professional footballer who plays as a defensive midfielder or centre-back for Erzgebirge Aue.

Taffertshofer's younger brother Emanuel is a youth exponent from 1860 Munich as well and plays for their first team in the 2. Bundesliga.

References

External links

1992 births
Living people
German footballers
Association football central defenders
Association football midfielders
2. Bundesliga players
3. Liga players
TSV 1860 Munich II players
SV Wacker Burghausen players
VfL Osnabrück players
FC Erzgebirge Aue players